Sofia Davidovna Miliband (17 July 1922, Moscow – 12 February 2017, Moscow) was a Russian Orientalist and Iranist, author, Doctor of Sciences of history and bibliography.

She was born to David Osipovich Miliband and his wife. Her ancestor Mikhl was a cantonist in Tallinn, while other ancestors lived at Warsaw.

She graduated from the oriental studies department of the MSU Faculty of History and became a research fellow at the Institute of Oriental Studies of the Russian Academy of Sciences working as an Iranist.

She is a second cousin of British Labour Party politicians, David and Ed Miliband.

References

Publications 

 Биобиблиографический словарь советских востоковедов (Biobibliographic Dictionary of Soviet Orientalists). Moscow: Nauka, 1975. — 734 pages. 
 Биобиблиографический словарь отечественных востоковедов: с 1917 г. (Biobibliographic Dictionary of Domestic Orientalists: from 1917). Moscow: Nauka, 1995. — 763 pages.
 Востоковеды России, XX — начало XXI века: биобиблиографический словарь (Russian orientalists of the 20th and Early 21st Centuries: A Biobibliographic Dictionary). 2 Vol. Moscow. Восточная литература. 2008. 
 Vol. 1: А — М. — 2008. — 968 pages. 
 Vol. 2: Н — Я. — 2008. — 1004 pages. 
 Востоковеды России, XX-начало XXI века. Дополнения и указатель (Russian Orientalists of the 20th and Early 21st Centuries: Addenda and Indices). Moscow: Восточная литература, 2009. — 70, [1] с.

External links 
  Софья Милибанд. Интервью. // Echo of Moscow

Russian orientalists
Soviet orientalists
Iranologists
Russian bibliographers
Women bibliographers
1922 births
2017 deaths
Academic staff of Moscow State University
Russian people of Estonian descent
Moscow State University alumni
Writers from Moscow
Russian Jews
Place of death missing
Soviet  Jews